The Wrestling Classic was a professional wrestling pay-per-view event produced by the World Wrestling Federation (WWF, now WWE). It took place on November 7, 1985, at the Rosemont Horizon in Rosemont, Illinois in the United States. It was the promotion's second ever pay-per-view (after WrestleMania).

In the main event, Junkyard Dog defeated Macho Man Randy Savage in the finals of a 16-man tournament. On the undercard WWF World Heavyweight Champion Hulk Hogan defeated "Rowdy" Roddy Piper. The event also included a fan competition for a Rolls-Royce.

Production

Background 
Following the success of their first pay-per-view (PPV) WrestleMania, the World Wrestling Federation (WWF, now WWE) scheduled The Wrestling Classic to be held on November 7, 1985, at the Rosemont Horizon in Rosemont, Illinois. It was the WWF's second-ever PPV produced, however, unlike WrestleMania, The Wrestling Classic was a one-off event.

Storylines 
The card consisted of fifteen matches that resulted from scripted storylines, where wrestlers portrayed villains, heroes, or less distinguishable characters in scripted events that built tension and culminated in a wrestling match or series of matches, with results predetermined by WWF's writers.

The main feud heading into Wrestling Classic was between Hulk Hogan and "Rowdy" Roddy Piper, with the two battling over the WWF World Heavyweight Championship. In 1985, Piper became the top heel of the promotion after he spoke out against the burgeoning Rock 'n' Wrestling connection, which led to a confrontation with Hogan. In February, they faced each other at MTV special The War to Settle the Score for Hogan's WWF World Heavyweight title, in which Hogan retained his title by disqualification. Their feud led to the development of WrestleMania. In the main event of the first-ever WrestleMania, Hogan and celebrity Mr. T defeated Piper and "Mr. Wonderful" Paul Orndorff. Hogan feuded with Piper and Bob Orton for the rest of the year and often got disqualification victories over them, leading to a WWF World Heavyweight title match between Hogan and Piper at the Wrestling Classic. A tournament was also promoted on WWF television which was to take place on the pay-per-view event.

Event 

The pay-per-view event included a 16-man tournament dubbed "The Wrestling Classic". 

In the first round of the tournament, Adrian Adonis (with manager Jimmy Hart) defeated Corporal Kirchner with a DDT. 

Dynamite Kid then faced Nikolai Volkoff (without manager Freddie Blassie); Dynamite Kid attacked Volkoff, who had just finished his customary singing of the Soviet national anthem, with a missile dropkick from the top turnbuckle and then quickly scored the pinfall in a match that lasted about six seconds (the official time given was nine seconds, equaling the record King Kong Bundy had set at WrestleMania). 

Macho Man Randy Savage (with Miss Elizabeth) then defeated "Polish Power" Ivan Putski, though Savage had both his feet on the middle rope for leverage. 

Ricky Steamboat faced Davey Boy Smith in a rare match pitting two fan favourites against each other. The match moved back and forth until Smith landed in the ropes trying attack Steamboat, but Steamboat sidestepped and Smith injured his groin and was unable to continue, so Steamboat was awarded the match by forfeit. 

Junkyard Dog then faced The Iron Sheik (like Volkoff, the Sheik appeared without Freddie Blassie). The match began with Sheik choking JYD with his jacket. He applied a camel clutch on JYD before releasing the hold. JYD quickly hit a headbutt on Sheik and pinned him to win the match. 

Moondog Spot and Terry Funk's (with Jimmy Hart) match was next. It appeared that neither of them wanted to wrestle, so at Funk's suggestion they both left the ring. As Spot started to leave, Funk attacked him from behind and tried to re-enter the ring for a countout win, but Spot prevented him from entering the ring and himself won the match by countout after Funk backdropped him into the ring before the ten count. 

Intercontinental Heavyweight Champion Tito Santana then faced The Magnificent Muraco (with Mr. Fuji). Muraco appeared to have pinned Santana but as his feet were on the ropes, the match continued and Santana rolled up the surprised Muraco with a quick small package, scoring the pinfall. Santana suffered a groin injury that would hamper him later in the tournament. 

The final match of the first round pitted Paul Orndorff against Bob Orton. Orton was disqualified after he hit Orndorff with his cast.

The quarterfinals began with Adrian Adonis facing Dynamite Kid. During the match, Adonis accidentally hit his manager Jimmy Hart and collided with Hart. Dynamite took advantage and pinned Adonis to win the match. 

Ricky Steamboat then faced off against Macho Man Randy Savage. The referee was distracted by Miss Elizabeth as Savage took advantage and pulled out brass knuckles from his tights and hit Steamboat before pinning him to win the match. 

Junkyard Dog then defeated Moondog Spot after a head butt. Strangely, there was no referee for this match and JYD counted the 3 himself. Commentators Gorilla Monsoon and Jesse Ventura then announced that a judge was at ringside and that JYD's count was legal. 

Tito Santana and Paul Orndorff fought to a double count-out, eliminating both wrestlers from the tournament in the process and allowing Junkyard Dog to advance to the finals. This led to Bobby Heenan's $50,000 storyline bounty on Paul Orndorff not being collected.

In a non-tournament match, Hulk Hogan defended his WWF World Heavyweight Championship against "Rowdy" Roddy Piper. Hogan applied a bearhug on Piper. Piper responded with a sleeper hold. The referee was knocked out and Piper hit Hogan with a steel chair before Hogan applied a sleeper hold of his own on Piper. Bob Orton came out and hit Hogan with his cast. The referee saw this and disqualified Piper in the process. Piper and Orton continued to assault Hogan until Paul Orndorff came out and cleared the ring.

The semi-final match between Randy Savage and Dynamite Kid was next. Dynamite Kid superplexed Savage off the top rope but Savage countered it into an inside cradle for the victory.

As part of the show, a fan competition was held. One of over 250,000 fans won a Rolls-Royce. This segment was cut from the Coliseum Home Video release for time. However, it was restored when the show aired on WWE Classics on Demand, WWE's archival video on demand service, as well as on the WWE Network.

In the finals of the tournament Junkyard Dog wrestled Randy Savage. JYD hit a back body drop on Savage off the top rope who landed on the arena floor. Savage was unable to get into the ring and was counted out. As a result, JYD won the match and the tournament.

Aftermath 
Many wrestlers received pushes by this tournament. Junkyard Dog, the winner of this tournament got a push as he became the man to win the first-ever major tournament in WWF history. Macho Man Randy Savage went on to win both the WWF Intercontinental Heavyweight Championship from Tito Santana on February 8, 1986 and the WWF World Heavyweight Championship in a similar tournament at WrestleMania IV in 1988. Ricky Steamboat also won the Intercontinental Heavyweight Championship, by defeating Savage at WrestleMania III in 1987. Dynamite Kid and Davey Boy Smith who together were the British Bulldogs would go on to win the WWF Tag Team Championship at WrestleMania 2 in 1986.

Results 

Following the double countout in the match between Paul Orndorff and Tito Santana, Junkyard Dog advanced to the finals with a BYE.

Tournament bracket
Pin-Pinfall; Sub-Submission; CO-Countout; DCO-Double countout; DQ-Disqualification; Ref-Referee's decision

References

External links 
 

1985 in Illinois
1985 WWF pay-per-view events
Events in Rosemont, Illinois
November 1985 events in the United States
Professional wrestling in the Chicago metropolitan area
WWE pay-per-view events